Maxine Cochran (August 5, 1926 – July 8, 2014) was a Canadian politician. She represented the electoral district of Lunenburg Centre in the Nova Scotia House of Assembly from 1984 to 1988. She is best known as the first female cabinet minister in Nova Scotia when she was appointed the Minister of Transportation on November 26, 1985.

Political career
Cochran was first elected in Lunenburg Centre in a byelection in 1984 after the death of her husband, Bruce, who previously held the seat. She was then re-elected a few months later in a general election and went on to hold a number of portfolios.

References

1926 births
2014 deaths
Progressive Conservative Association of Nova Scotia MLAs
Women MLAs in Nova Scotia
Members of the Executive Council of Nova Scotia
People from Annapolis County, Nova Scotia
People from Lunenburg County, Nova Scotia
Women government ministers of Canada